Hendrik Island is an island in far northern Greenland. Its area is 583 km2. It is part of the Northeast Greenland National Park.

The island is named after Inuit Arctic explorer Hendrik Olsen, who was a member of Knud Rasmussen's Second Thule Expedition 1916–1917.

Geography
Hendrik Island is a large coastal island located east of Nyeboe Land, between Saint George Fjord to the west and Sherard Osborn Fjord to the east. Its southern end faces the mouth of Hartz Sound, off the Warming Land Peninsula. 
The northernmost headland of the island is Dragon Point. Smaller Castle Island lies in Saint Andrew Bay off the northeastern shore of Hendrik Island.

The island is largely unglaciated except for small glaciers. It is mountainous, with a peak at its northern end reaching 1152 m. The sea around the island is rarely free from ice.

See also
List of islands of Greenland
List of features in Greenland named after Greenlandic Inuit

References

Uninhabited islands of Greenland